St Georges Hall was a theatre building in Perth, Western Australia.

Construction
The hall was constructed in 1879 and was the first dedicated theatre building in Perth.

Demolition
The building was demolished in the 1980s with the portico retained. In 2008 the District Court Building was constructed behind the portico.

References

Theatres in Perth, Western Australia
Hay Street, Perth
Theatres completed in 1879
State Register of Heritage Places in the City of Perth